Buchan is an area within Aberdeenshire in Scotland

Buchan may also refer to:

People 
Buchan (surname)
Clan Buchan, Scotland
Earl of Buchan, originally the ruler of the medieval province of Buchan

Places in or near Scotland 
RAF Buchan, a former Royal Air Force station near Peterhead in Aberdeenshire, now known as Remote Radar Head Buchan
Buchan Oil Field, east of Aberdeen

Places in Australia 
Buchan, Victoria, a town
Buchan Caves, a group of caves in Buchan, Victoria

Other uses 

 Buchan Hill, West Sussex, England
 The Buchan School on the Isle of Man

See also
Buchen (disambiguation)
Buchon (disambiguation)